Asia is the largest and most populous continent and the birthplace of many religions including Buddhism, Christianity, Confucianism, Hinduism, Islam, Jainism, Judaism, Shinto, Sikhism, Taoism, and Zoroastrianism. All major religious traditions are practiced in the region and new forms are constantly emerging. Asia is noted for its diversity of culture. Islam and Hinduism are the largest religions in Asia with approximately 1.2 billion adherents each.

History
Asia is the birthplace of 11 major religions, whose written records include Judaism, Hinduism, Taoism, Shintoism, Zoroastrianism, Buddhism, Jainism, Christianity, Islam, Sikhism and the Baha'i Faith.

Abrahamic religions

Judaism
Judaism is the predominant religion in Israel (75.6%), which has a nominal Jewish population of about 6.1 million.

Outside of Israel there are small diaspora communities of Jewish people living in Turkey (17,400), Azerbaijan (9,100), Iran (8,756), India (5,000) and Uzbekistan (4,000).

Christianity

Christianity is an Abrahamic monotheistic religion based on the life and teachings of Jesus of Nazareth. Its adherents, known as Christians, believe that Jesus is the Christ, whose coming as the Messiah was prophesied in the Hebrew Bible, called the Old Testament in Christianity, and chronicled in the New Testament which are brought together in the Christian Bible as canonical scripture. It is the world's largest religion with about 2.4 billion followers and is culturally and traditionally diverse. Christianity is a widespread minority religion in Asia with more than 286 million adherents according to Pew Research Center in 2010, and nearly 364 million according to Britannica Book of the Year 2014. constituting around 12.6% of the total population of Asia.

Only six countries are predominantly Christian: Asian Russia which predominantly adheres to the Russian Orthodox Church; Cyprus, which is predominantly Orthodox; the Philippines, which is the third-largest Roman Catholic nation in the world; Timor Leste, which is the most overwhelming Christian (99.6%) and Roman Catholic nation in Asia (97.6%); Armenia, which was the first state to adopt a Christian denomination as its state religion; and Georgia (88.1). Christianity also accounts for 29.2% of South Korea's population (54.5% of its religious population) and is now the predominant religion in South Korea, Christianity is also a large minority religion in Lebanon accounting for 40% of its population. Christianity is also a large minority religion in Kazakhstan (26%), Singapore (18.3%), and Kyrgyzstan (17%).

Asian countries with large Christian populations are Philippines (84 million), China (68 million), India (30 million), Indonesia (28 million), Kazakhstan (4.7 million), South Korea (15 million), Vietnam (7 million), Georgia (4.6 million), Armenia (3.2 million), Malaysia (2.6 million), Japan (2.5 million), Pakistan (2.5 million), Uzbekistan (2.5 million), Syria (1.8 million), Sri Lanka (1.5 million), East Timor (1.2 million) and Taiwan (one million).

There are still large ancient communities of Middle Eastern Christians and Arab Christians in Lebanon, Iraq, Iran, Turkey, Syria, Jordan, Israel and Palestine numbering more than 3 million in West Asia. There are also a large populations of expatriate workers which include a sizeable Christian communities live in Arabian Peninsula numbering more than 3 million.

Islam

Islam is a monotheistic and Abrahamic religion articulated by the Qur'an, a book considered by its adherents to be the verbatim word of God (Arabic: الله Allāh) and by the teachings and normative example (called the Sunnah and composed of hadith) of Muhammad, considered by them to be the last prophet of God. Islam is the largest religions in Asia with about 1.3 billion adherents. Asia constitute in absolute terms the world's Muslim population. South and Southeast Asia are home of the most populous Muslim countries, with Indonesia, Pakistan, India, and Bangladesh having more than 100 million adherents each. According to U.S. government figures, in 2006 there were 20 million Muslims in China. In Western Asia, the non-Arab countries of Iran and Turkey are the largest Muslim-majority countries. In South Asia, Pakistan and Bangladesh are the countries with the largest Muslim-majority. In Central Asia, Afghanistan and Uzbekistan are the countries with the largest Muslim-majority.

Indonesia is 86% Muslim and is the country with the largest Muslim population in the world, Pakistan is 97% Muslim, Bangladesh is 89%.
India's Muslim population is 14% of the total, approximately 200 million people. Around 6-11 percent, some 6 - 12 million people in the Philippines are Muslim. 
Thailand's Muslims make up 4.6 percent of the population, or approximately 3 million people. Also Sri Lanka's Muslims make up 10 percent of the population, or approximately 2.5 million people

Bangladesh, Malaysia, Indonesia, Brunei, Kazakhstan, Qatar, Kuwait, Pakistan, Afghanistan, Uzbekistan, Maldives, Tajikistan, Turkmenistan, Iraq, Iran, Syria, Saudi Arabia, Bahrain, Yemen, United Arab Emirates, Oman, Turkey, Azerbaijan, Kyrgyzstan, Jordan, Palestine and Lebanon are the 27 Muslim majority states in Asia.

Baháʼí Faith

The Baháʼí Faith is an Abrahamic religion although it is quite different from Christianity, Islam, and Judaism. It was so founded by Bahá'u'lláh in what was then Persia (also known as Iran). Today the largest national population of Baháʼís is in India with between 1.7 million to over 2 million, where there is also the Lotus Temple. Significant populations are found in many countries including Vietnam and Malaysia where "about 1%", some 260,000, of the population are Bahá'ís. In other places, like Kazakhstan there are 25 Local Spiritual Assemblies.

In modern-day Iran, the religion is severely persecuted (see Persecution of Baháʼís). In neighboring Turkmenistan, Baháʼí Faith is effectively banned, and individuals have had their homes raided for Baháʼí literature.

Druze

Druze are an Arabic-speaking esoteric ethnoreligious group originating in Western Asia who self-identify as The People of Monotheism (Al-Muwaḥḥidūn). Jethro of Midian is considered an ancestor of Druze, who revere him as their spiritual founder and chief prophet. It is a monotheistic and Abrahamic religion based on the teachings of Hamza ibn Ali ibn Ahmad and the sixth Fatimid caliph, al-Hakim bi-Amr Allah, and Ancient Greek philosophers such as Plato, Aristotle, Pythagoras, and Zeno of Citium. Druze do not identify as Muslims.

The number of Druze people worldwide is between 800,000 and one million, with the vast majority residing in the Levant. The Institute of Druze Studies estimates that 40–50% of Druze live in Syria, 30–40% in Lebanon, 6–7% in Israel, and 1–2% in Jordan. About 2% of the Druze population are also scattered within other countries in the Middle East.

The Lebanese Druze are believed to constitute about 5.2 percent or 250,000, Syrian Druze are believed to constitute an estimated 3.2 percent of the population (as of 2010), or approximately 700,000 persons (including residents of the Golan Heights). In 2019, there were 143,000 Druze living in Israel, 1.6% of the total population of the country. The Jordanian Druze are believed to constitute about 0.5% of the total population of Jordan, which is around 32,000.

East Asian religions

East Asian religions (also known as Far Eastern religions, Chinese religions, or Taoic religions) form a subset of the Eastern religions.

Confucianism 

Confucianism was founded in ancient China by Confucius (551 B.C.E. - 479). Confucianism is a complex of moral, social, political, philosophical, and religious concerns that permeated the culture and history of East Asia. Confucianism emphasizes family, social hierarchy, and personal integrity and is manifested in practices and attitudes rather than institutions and is centered on the family and local society. It was, however, considered the state religion of East Asian countries in some periods. Today the Chinese, Korean, Japanese and Vietnamese diasporas have brought Confucianism to all parts of the world.

Taoism

Taoism (also romanized Daoism) is a diverse philosophical and religious tradition that emphasizes living in harmony with the Tao (also romanized "Dao"), a term that means "way", "path" or "principle". The concept is shared with other Chinese philosophies and religions. In Taoism, however, Tao denotes both the source and the driving force inherent in everything that exists. It is ultimately ineffable: "The Tao that can be told is not the eternal Tao."

Laozi is traditionally regarded as the founder of Taoism and is closely associated with "original", or "primordial", Taoism. Whether he actually existed is commonly disputed; however, the work attributed to him – the Daodejing – is dated to the late 4th century BC.

Taoist propriety and ethics vary according to the particular school, but in general tends to emphasize wu-wei (action through non-action), "naturalness", simplicity, spontaneity, and the Three Treasures: compassion, moderation, and humility.

Significant Taoist communities can be found in China, Taiwan, Hong Kong, Singapore, Malaysia, Korea, Japan, Vietnam and among the Chinese, Korean, Japanese and Vietnamese diaspora communities.

Chinese folk religion

Chinese folk religion is a label used to describe the ethnic religious traditions which have been a main belief system in China and among the Han Chinese ethnic group for most of the civilization's history. This group of diverse beliefs comprises Chinese mythology and includes the worship of various Shen (神, shén; "deities", "spirits", "awarenesses", "consciousnesses", "archetypes") which can be nature deities, Taizu or clan deities, city deities, national deities, cultural heroes and demigods, dragons and ancestors. Chinese folk religion is sometimes categorized with Taoism, since over the world institutional Taoism has been attempting to assimilate or administer local religions. More accurately, Taoism can be defined as a component of Chinese religion, since it sprang out of folk religion and Chinese philosophy. Chinese folk religion is sometimes seen as a constituent part of Chinese traditional religion, but more often, the two are regarded as synonymous. With around 454 million adherents or about 6.6% of the world population, Chinese folk religion is one of the major religious traditions in the world. In China more than 30% of the population adheres to folk religions or Taoism.

Shinto

Kami-no-michi is almost unique to Japan and the Japanese diaspora. It is a set of practices carried out to establish a connection between present-day Japan and its ancient past. Shinto practices were first recorded and codified in the written records of the Kojiki and Nihon Shoki in the 7th and 8th centuries. Still, these earliest Japanese writings do not refer to a unified "Shinto religion", but rather to disorganized folklore, history, and mythology. Shinto today applies to the public shrines suited to various purposes such as war memorials, harvest festivals, romance, and historical monuments, as well as various sectarian organizations.

Shinto is the largest religion in Japan, practiced by nearly 80% of the population, yet only a small percentage of these identify themselves as "Shintoists" in surveys. According to surveys carried out in 2006 and 2008 show that 3% to 3.9% of the population of Japan are members of Shinto sects and derived religions.

Mugyo

Muism ("religion of the Mu") or sometimes Sinism (Shingyo, "religion of the gods", with shin being the Korean character derivative of the Hanja), encompasses a variety of indigenous religious beliefs and practices of the Korean people, the Korean sphere and the Korean diaspora. In contemporary South Korea, the most used term is Muism and a shaman is known as a mudang. The role of the mudang, usually a woman, is to act as intermediary between a spirit entity, spirits or gods and human beings.

Women are enlisted by those who want the help of the spirit world. Shamans hold gut, or services, in order to gain good fortune for clients, cure illnesses by exorcising negative or 'bad' spirits that cling to people, or propitiate local or village gods. Such services are also held to guide the spirit of a deceased person to higher realms. Today this religion is a minority, but has in recent years seen a resurgence.

Vietnamese folk religion

Vietnamese folk religion or Vietnamese indigenous religion (sometimes just called , Chữ Hán: 道良), is the largest religion in Vietnam  with about 45.3% of the Vietnamese population that are associated with this religion. Vietnamese folk religion is not an organized religious system, but a set of local worship traditions devoted to the thần, a term which can be translated as "spirits", "gods" or with the more exhaustive locution "generative powers". These gods can be nature deities or national, community or kinship tutelary deities or ancestral gods and the ancestral gods of a specific family. Ancestral gods are often deified heroic persons. Vietnamese mythology preserves narratives telling of the actions of many of the cosmic gods and cultural heroes.

The Vietnamese indigenous religion is sometimes identified as Confucianism since it carries values that were emphasized by Confucius. Đạo Mẫu is a distinct form of Vietnamese folk religion, giving prominence to some mother goddesses into its pantheon. The government of Vietnam also categorises Caodaism as a form of Vietnamese indigenous religion, since it brings together the worship of the thần or local spirits with Buddhism, Confucianism and Taoism, as well as elements of Catholicism, Spiritism and Theosophy.

Indian religions

Dharmic religions are the oldest religions of Asia. All Indian religions originated in the Indian subcontinent. These religions all have the similar concepts like dharma, karma, and reincarnation, but the interpretation of these concepts varies with each religion.

Hinduism 

Hinduism is the second largest religion in Asia with about 1.3 billion followers, mainly in South and Southeast Asia. Hinduism, like all Dharmic religions, originates in India. More than 94% of the global Hindu population live in India. Demographically, it is the largest religion in India (80%), Nepal (85%), and the island of Bali (87%), with strong minorities in the Asian nations of Bhutan, Fiji, Indonesia, Malaysia, Bangladesh, Pakistan, Singapore, Sri Lanka, United Arab Emirates, Oman, Yemen, Russia, Saudi Arabia, Bahrain, Kuwait, Qatar, Myanmar, the Philippines, and Afghanistan. As of 2020, India has a Hindu population of 1.10 billion, Nepal has a Hindu population of 23.5 million, and there are 14.5 million Hindus in Bangladesh. 

Hinduism is a fusion that resulted from incorporating the tribal cultures, tribal and folk religions, and tribal deities. Its principles like karma, moksha, rebirth, reincarnation, renunciation, samsara are incorporated into Sramana traditions like Buddhism, Jainism, and the traditions predating the Buddha and Mahavira.

Buddhism

Buddhism was founded by Siddartha Gautama, who is known as the Buddha. Buddhism is the fourth largest world religion and the third largest religion in Asia, which is adhere by 12% of Asia's population. It is the predominant religion and hold the majority population in Thailand (95%), Myanmar (89%), Cambodia (98%), Sri Lanka (70%), Laos (67%), Mongolia (54%), Japan (20%. - 36% or 67%), Bhutan (75%), Tibet (79%) and Macau (80%). Large Buddhist populations reside in Taiwan (35%), Singapore (33%), South Korea (22.9%), Malaysia (19.8%), China (18.2%), Hong Kong (15%), North Korea (13.8%), Nepal (10.7%), Vietnam (10%), Ladakh (39.65%) and Sikkim (27.39%). There are also strong Buddhist minorities in India, Indonesia, Brunei, the Philippines, Bangladesh and Russia. 

Before the advent of Islam, Buddhism was one of the most widely practiced religions in Central Asia, Afghanistan, Malaysia, the Philippines, and Indonesia.

Jainism

Jainism is an Indian religion. Jains are mostly found in India but are increasingly found throughout the world. Jains have significantly influenced and contributed to ethical, political and economic spheres in India. Jains have an ancient tradition of scholarship and have the highest degree of literacy for a religious community in India. Jain libraries are the oldest in the country. It has traditionally been confined to the Indian subcontinent. It is based on the teachings of Vardhaman Mahavir and also on 23 other Tirthankaras.

Sikhism

Sikhism is the fifth largest organized religion in the world, with approximately 30 million adherents. And one of the most steadily growing. It is a monotheistic religion founded by Guru Nanak Dev in the 1500s. The religion professes its roots in the area of Punjab region, in the northern part of the Indian subcontinent.

This system of religious philosophy and expression has been traditionally known as the Gurmat (literally the counsel of the gurus) or the Sikh Dharm. Sikhism originated from the word Sikh, which in turn comes from the Sanskrit root śhiṣhya meaning "disciple" or "learner", or śhikṣha meaning "instruction".

Sikhism is the 4th largest religion in India with 2% of the total population being Sikh. There is also a large concentration of Sikhs in Malaysia, Thailand, Burma, the Philippines, Pakistan, Afghanistan, Hongkong, Singapore, Indonesia, Kuwait and U.A.E.

Iranian religions

Zoroastrianism

Zoroastrianism was once the state religion of the Persian Empire, but is now a minority mostly found in India and Iran. It worships a monotheistic god, Ahura Mazda, and was founded by Zoroaster. Zoroastrianism is a religion and philosophy based on the teachings of prophet Zoroaster (also known as Zarathustra, in Avestan), probably founded some time before the 6th century BC. The term Zoroastrianism is, in general usage, essentially synonymous with Mazdaism, i.e., the worship of Ahura Mazda, exalted by Zoroaster as the supreme divine authority.

In Zoroastrianism, the Creator Ahura Mazda is all good, and no evil originates from Him. Thus, in Zoroastrianism good and evil have distinct sources, with evil (druj) trying to destroy the creation of Mazda (asha), and good trying to sustain it. Mazda is not immanent in the world, and His creation is represented by the Amesha Spentas and the host of other Yazatas, through whom the works of God are evident to humanity, and through whom worship of Mazda is ultimately directed. The most important texts of the religion are those of the Avesta, of which a significant portion has been lost, and mostly only the liturgies of which have survived. The lost portions are known of only through references and brief quotations in the later works of (primarily) the 9th-11th centuries.

The total number of currently practicing adherents of Zoroastrianism is unknown. A 2004 estimate gives a range of 124,000 to 190,000, roughly half of them in India (the Parsi and Irani groups).

The largest number of Zoroastrians in Asia can be found in India; according to the 2001 census, they amounted 69,000. In Iran, there were some 25,000 according to the 2011 census. In 2012, the numbers for Zoroastrians in Asia were; India (61,000), Iran (15,000 / 22,271), Persian Gulf Countries (1,900) Pakistan (1,675) and Singapore (372).

Shamanism and animism
Shamanism and animism have historically been practised in Asia, and is still practiced in most of Asia.

Irreligion 
According to a Pew Research Center survey in 2012 religiously unaffiliated (including agnostics and atheists) make up about 21.2% of Asia population. According to the same survey, the religiously unaffiliated are the majority of the population in four Asian countries/territories: North Korea (71%), Japan (57%), Hong Kong (56%), and Mainland China (52%).

Other sources say that in the People's Republic of China, 59% of the population claim to be non-religious. However, this percentage may be significantly greater (up to 80%) or smaller (down to 30%) in reality, because some Chinese define religion differently. Some Chinese define religion as practicing customs (which may be done for cultural or traditional reasons), while others define it as actually consciously believing their religion will lead to post-mortem salvation or reincarnation. A Dentsu statistic states that 46% of Vietnamese and 51% of Japanese are irreligious.

Religious distribution

See also

Buddhism and Eastern religions
Eastern religion
Major religious groups
Northeast China folk religion
Regional forms of shamanism
Religion in Africa
Religion in Europe
Religion in Oceania
Religion in North America
Religion in South America
Religion in the Mongol Empire
Tengrism (Turko-Mongolic religion)
Three Teachings

References